Astroblepus marmoratus is a species of catfish of the family Astroblepidae. It can be found on the Orinoco River in Venezuela.

References

Bibliography
 Eschmeyer, William N., ed. 1998. Catalog of Fishes. Special Publication of the Center for Biodiversity Research and Information, num. 1, vol. 1–3. California Academy of Sciences. San Francisco, California, United States. 2905. .

Astroblepus
Fish described in 1904
Fish of Venezuela
Catfish of South America
Taxa named by Charles Tate Regan